The women's 10,000 metres event at the 2016 Summer Olympics took place on 12 August at the Olympic Stadium. The gold medal was won by Ethiopian Almaz Ayana—in only her second 10,000 m race on the track—in a world record time of 29 minutes, 17.45 seconds. London 2012 bronze medallist Vivian Cheruiyot won silver for Kenya, with reigning Olympic champion Tirunesh Dibaba of Ethiopia taking bronze.

Summary
Ethiopia's Tirunesh Dibaba entered as the defending 2012 Olympic champion and Vivian Cheruiyot of Kenya was the reigning 10,000 m World Champion at that point. However, it was Almaz Ayana who had the season-leading time of 30:07.00, the fastest time recorded in seven years for the distance and also her debut.

At the start of the race the 37-woman field was led by Alice Aprot Nawowuna of Kenya. Nawowuna quickly increased the pace, turning the group of runners into a single file, and after five laps the leading group was reduced to eight: three Kenyans (Nawowuna, Cheruiyot and Betsy Saina), three Ethiopians (Almaz Ayana, Tirunesh Dibaba and Gelete Burka), Kenyan ex-pat Yasemin Can of Turkey and Molly Huddle of the United States. The pace remained high from that point on, unusual for an international championship. Huddle was the first to fall away from the pack, followed by Gelete Burka. With twelve laps remaining, Almaz Ayana suddenly took the lead from Nawowuna, disrupting a leading group that had already begun to lap the race's slower runners.

Almaz Ayana continued the fast pace and even increased it, regularly running under 71 seconds per lap. Cheruiyot was the only other athlete near, though she was still some 15–20 metres behind. Almaz lapped all the runners from tenth downwards and completed the distance in 29:17.45, knocking 14 seconds off Wang Junxia's 22-year-old record (which itself had stood twenty-two seconds faster than any athlete before that point). Cheruiyot was runner-up and less than a second outside of the old world record. Defending champion Tirunesh Dibaba won the bronze with the fourth fastest time ever and Nawowuna was also under half an hour to record the fifth fastest time ever in fourth place.		

In addition to Almaz Ayana's world and Olympic record time, a total of eight national records were broken at the competition. Molly Huddle's run of 30:13.17 in sixth place was the area record for the North, Central American and Caribbean region and number 17 of all time.  In fifteenth place, just 5 weeks short of 43 years old, Jo Pavey set the Masters World Record at 31:33.44.  Further down the field, only four of the top twenty athletes did not set personal bests.

The medals for the competition were presented by Mrs. Dagmawit Girmay Berhane, IOC member, and the gifts were presented by Lord Sebastian Coe, President of the International Association of Athletics Federations.

Schedule
All times are Brasília Time (UTC−3).

Records
, the existing World and Olympic records were as follows.

The following records were established during the competition:

The following national records were established during the competition:

Results

Final

References

Women's 10,000 metres
2016 women
Olympics 10,000 metres
Women's events at the 2016 Summer Olympics